The 1997 Infiniti Open was a men's tennis tournament played on Hardcourt in Los Angeles, United States that was part of the World Series of the 1997 ATP Tour. It was the seventieth edition of the tournament and was held from July 21 through July 27, 1997.

Michael Chang did not return to defend his title, as he opted to rest in order to compete at Montreal in the following week.

Jim Courier won the title by defeating Thomas Enqvist 6–4, 6–4 in the final.

Seeds 
Champion seeds are indicated in bold text while text in italics indicates the round in which those seeds were eliminated.

Draw

Finals

Top half

Bottom half

References

External links 
 Official results archive (ATP)
 Official results archive (ITF)

Singles
Los Angeles Open (tennis)
Tennis tournaments in the United States